The Ward Valley (California) is a lengthy almost true N-S trending valley of far eastern San Bernardino County, California. 

Mountain ranges surround the valley on all sides. The neighboring valleys eastward over the mountain ranges, Chemehuevi Valley, Vidal Valley, and Rice Valley are all western tributary valleys to the south-flowing Colorado River along the Lower Colorado River Valley corridor.

The center of the valley is approximately just east of the Oro Plata Mine at the east of the Old Woman Mountains.

The Iron Mountains with the Iron Mountain Pump Plant of the Colorado River Aqueduct lie on the southwest margin of the valley.

Geography
The map of California showing the location of Ward Valley, also shows the low elevation green, low valleys, south of the 'map location point'. The northwest-by-southeast section, contains the three dry lake beds, from west to east: Bristol Lake, Cadiz Dry Lake, and Danby Lake.

Geographically, the entire region of Ward Valley is a transition from higher elevation bajadas and mountain ranges of the Mojave Desert, to lower elevation sections of Mojave Desert, and the northwest region of the Sonoran Desert in southeast California, called the Colorado Desert. The region has mostly arid mountain ranges, bajadas, flatlands, sand dune fields (from prevailing, seasonal winds), and playas (salt-flats).

The lengthy north section of Ward Valley is drained by one major wash, named Homer Wash. Its outfall end, due to scant rainfall, and distance from Danby Lake, ends about 5-mi from the north side of the lake (ground infiltration).

See also
Rice Valley
Danby Lake
Valleys of San Bernardino County

References

External links
Approximately valley center (N-S), at western foothills of mountains, Topoquest.com, the Oro Plata Mine

Endorheic basins of the United States
Valleys of the Mojave Desert
Valleys of San Bernardino County, California